Peter Walker is an American landscape architect and the founder of PWP Landscape Architecture.

Early life and education
Walker grew up in California, where he attended the University of California, Berkeley.  Walker started out studying journalism but quickly changed his field and received a Bachelor of Science in Landscape Architecture in 1955. He did graduate studies at the University of Illinois, where he studied under Stanley White.

Walker attended the Harvard Graduate School of Design, where he received his master's degree in Landscape Architecture in 1957 and won the school's Jacob Weidenmann Prize that year.

Career
At Harvard University, Walker had been deeply influenced by his professor, Hideo Sasaki. After graduating, he worked for Sasaki. Shortly thereafter, they both went into partnership to form Sasaki Walker Associates in 1957. Walker and Sasaki went their separate ways in 1983, and Walker entered a partnership with landscape architect Martha Schwartz.

In the early 1990s, Walker formed Peter Walker and Partners. In a 1993 review, Walker was one of four landscape architects named as representative of the new generation. The company developed into an interdisciplinary firm that employs around thirty to forty landscape architects. The company has received many awards and co-designed the World Trade Center Memorial in New York with architect Michael Arad.

Walker designed the garden for the Nasher Sculpture Center. In 2013 he was involved in a public argument with the architect of a neighboring building, Museum Tower, because the glare from the glass was damaging the vegetation. Walker described it as "public desecration".

Peter Walker is also a co-author of Invisible Gardens, which touches on the modernist movement in the United States and the comparison of other landscapes to those in Europe. The book discusses influential landscape architects, including Sasaki.

Awards
2004 - The ASLA Medal, the highest medal of the American Society of Landscape Architects.
2004 - ASLA Honor Award: Design, Nasher Sculpture Center
2005 - The Geoffrey Jellicoe Gold Medal from the International Federation of Landscape Architects.
2008 - The ASLA Landmark Award for Tanner Fountain at Harvard University, Cambridge, Massachusetts
2010 - Knight Management Center: Stanford GSB awarded Green Project of the Year by the Silicon Valley/San Jose Business Journal
2012 - The J.C. Nichols Prize Winner for Visionaries in Urban Development from the Urban Land Institute
2012 - Peter Walker & PWP Landscape Architecture awarded the Liberty Award by the Lower Manhattan Cultural Council.
2012 - The ASLA Medal Recipient.
2014 - The James Daniel Bybee Prize Recipient.

Notable projects

 Australia 
 Barangaroo Headlands Park in Sydney, New South Wales
 Millennium Parklands in Sydney

 Europe 
  Novartis Headquarters in Basel, Switzerland
 The Sony Center in Berlin, Germany
 Munich Airport - Hotel Kempinski in Munich, Germany

 United States 
 National 911 Memorial in New York, New York
 Transbay Terminal in San Francisco, California
 Jamison Square in Portland, Oregon
 Pixar Headquarters in Emeryville, California
 Constitution Gardens in Washington, D.C. (won competition for partial redesign in 2012)
 Glenstone in Potomac, Maryland
Newport Beach Civic Center and Park in Newport Beach, California
University of Texas at Dallas Campus in Richardson, Texas

 Asia 
 Jewel Changi Airport in Singapore
 Marina Bay Sands in Singapore
 Ciudad de Victoria in Bocaue, Philippines

Publications

Books
 Walker, Peter, and Leah Levy. Peter Walker: Minimalist Gardens. Washington, DC: Spacemaker, 1997. Print.
 Invisible Gardens: The Search for Modernism in the American Landscape. Walker, Peter, and Melanie Simo. Cambridge, Massachusetts: MIT-Press, 1998. Print.Cambridge, Massachusetts: MIT-Press, 1998.
 Peter Walker and Partners: Defining the Craft.'' Walker, Peter. San Rafael, CA: ORO Editions, 2005. Print.

Sources

References

External links
 Official site

Living people
American landscape architects
American landscape and garden designers
UC Berkeley College of Environmental Design alumni
University of Illinois College of Fine and Applied Arts alumni
Harvard Graduate School of Design alumni
Year of birth missing (living people)